This is a list of islands of Honduras.  There are at least 99 islands in Honduras.

Islands
The following islands are part of Honduras:
Caribbean islands (all part of Islas de la Bahía Department)
Bobel Cay, 
Cayos Cochinos (Islas de la Bahía), 
Cayo Cochino Grande (Mayor), 
Cayo Cochino Menor, 
Cayo Culebra, 
Cayo Gallo
Cayo Timon
Cayo Zacate
Cayo Arena, 
Cayo Bolanos
Cayo Paloma (nature preserve), 
Cayo Borrego
Cayo Balfate
Cayo Largo Arriba
Cayo Redondo, 
Cayo Chachahaute 2
Cayo Chachahaute, 
Islas de la Bahía, 
Guanaja (Islas de la Bahía), 
Roatán (Islas de la Bahía) (Isla Roatan), 
Barbareta (Islas de la Bahía Department), 
Utila (Islas de la Bahía), 
Savanna Cay, 
Cayo Sur, 
Swan Islands 
Isla Grande, 
Little Swan Island (Isla Pequeña), 
Cayo Gorda, 
Isla Zacate Grande, 
Pacific islands (part of Valle department)
Isla del Tigre, 
Isla Conejo (disputed island, El Salvador),

See also
List of Caribbean islands
List of islands

References 

Islands
Honduras